Charles Glenn "Chick" Doak (October 7, 1884 – April 21, 1956) coached baseball at North Carolina State University from 1924 to 1939 where he accumulated 145 wins, 131 losses, 6 ties.

Doak also played in the minor leagues and coached several college teams, such as at Guilford College, the University of North Carolina, and Trinity College.

Doak led the Wolfpack (the players were known as the "Doakmen") to the South Atlantic Championship only twice in his 16 seasons as coach (1924 and 1928), but his view that "the best defense is a hell of an offense" made for exciting games. Doak remained on NC State's physical education faculty until 1955. The baseball field to the east of Reynolds Coliseum (a space now occupied by the Coliseum parking deck) was named in his honor, and the name persisted to the fields current site. His sons, Charles and Robert, both played baseball for NC State.

Coach at North Carolina
After Nathaniel Cartmell was fired as the North Carolina Tar Heels men's basketball coach in 1914 for playing dice with known gamblers, Doak took over as the second head coach for the Tar Heels.  Doak was generally more interested in coaching baseball and was not fully focused on coaching basketball.  During the 1915–16 season, it was too difficult to get referees and so on some occasions Doak would actually referee games that the Tar Heels were playing.
Doak was fairly successful as the head coach of the basketball team, but stepped down as head coach after the 1916 season to be replaced by Howell Peacock.

Death
Doak died of a heart attack in 1956.

Head coaching record

Basketball

References

Sources

External links
 Guide to the Lucia Messina Collection on Charles "Chick" Doak 1958, 2013
 
 
 
 

1884 births
1956 deaths
Albany Babies players
Basketball coaches from North Carolina
Charleston Sea Gulls players
Charlotte Hornets (baseball) players
Duke Blue Devils men's basketball coaches
Greensboro Champs players
Greensboro Patriots players
Guilford College alumni
Guilford Quakers men's basketball coaches
Montgomery Rebels players
NC State Wolfpack baseball coaches
North Carolina Tar Heels baseball coaches
North Carolina Tar Heels men's basketball coaches
People from Guilford County, North Carolina
Winston-Salem Twins players